Charles Edward Ferguson (November 13, 1939 – February 14, 2023) was an American professional football player who was a tight end in the American Football League (AFL) with the Buffalo Bills. He was in playoff games with the Bills in four straight years from 1963 to 1966, and won AFL championships with them in 1964 and 1965.  He was an AFL All-Star in 1965.

Ferguson also played in the National Football League for the Cleveland Browns and Minnesota Vikings.

See also
List of American Football League players

References

1939 births
2023 deaths
Players of American football from Dallas
American football wide receivers
Tennessee State Tigers football players
Cleveland Browns players
Minnesota Vikings players
Buffalo Bills players
American Football League All-Star players
American Football League players